The manjur is a musical instrument used in Eastern Arabia but with East African origins. It is made of goat hooves attached to a cloth. It is played by tying the instrument around the waist. The performer then shakes his or her hips to create a rattling sound as the hooves collide with one other.

It is used in the fann at-Tanbura and zar performances.

See also
 Kahliji

External links
 Mangur - Oman Centre for Traditional Music
 The Tambura

Arabic music
Asian percussion instruments
African percussion instruments
Bahraini musical instruments
Kuwaiti musical instruments
Omani musical instruments
Qatari musical instruments
Music of the African diaspora
Emirati musical instruments